John McCargo (born August 19, 1983) is a former American football defensive tackle. He was drafted by the Buffalo Bills in the first round of the 2006 NFL Draft. He played college football at North Carolina State. McCargo also played for the Tampa Bay Buccaneers and Chicago Bears.

Professional career

Buffalo Bills
Many draft experts considered McCargo a late-2nd or early-3rd round pick before the 2006 NFL Draft.  Because of this, many people were shocked when the Bills traded up to select him in the first round with the 26th overall selection.

McCargo spent most of the 2006 season on injured reserve. He passed out at training camp his rookie season, mainly because he had to run difficult drills in hot weather at his 300-pound frame. He was the second string defensive tackle behind Larry Tripplett in 2007, and played in all 16 games.

On October 14, 2008, McCargo was traded to the Indianapolis Colts for an undisclosed draft pick, having been beaten out in the depth chart by Kyle Williams. However, after failing his physical the following day, the trade was voided and McCargo was returned to the Bills.

Tampa Bay Buccaneers
McCargo signed with the Tampa Bay Buccaneers on August 20, 2011. He was waived on September 2.

On November 8, 2011, the Buccaneers re-signed McCargo to fill a roster void caused by a season-ending injury to Gerald McCoy. McCargo was again cut the next day after the Buccaneers signed Albert Haynesworth. 

A week later McCargo was once-again re-signed, following a season-ending knee injury to George Johnson. On May 2, 2012, the Buccaneers again released McCargo.

Chicago Bears
McCargo signed with the Chicago Bears on May 10, 2012. During the second game of the preseason against the Washington Redskins, McCargo recovered a fumble by Redskins running back Antwon Bailey.

On August 26, the Bears waived McCargo.

Personal life
In October 2017, McCargo was arrested on gun and drug charges in Virginia. There had also been a warrant out for his arrest after domestic violence charges were brought against him in California.

References

External links
Official website

1983 births
Living people
People from Charlotte County, Virginia
Players of American football from Virginia
American football defensive tackles
NC State Wolfpack football players
Buffalo Bills players
Tampa Bay Buccaneers players
Chicago Bears players